Domnista is a village and a former municipality in Evrytania, Greece. Since the 2011 local government reform, it is part of the municipality Karpenisi, of which it is a municipal unit. The municipal unit has an area of 215.755 km2. Population 1,072 (2011). The seat of the municipality was in Krikello.

References

Populated places in Evrytania